Henry Titus Welles (April 3, 1821 – March 4, 1898) was a lawyer, businessman and Democratic politician who served as the first mayor of St. Anthony, Minnesota.

Life and career
Welles was born in Glastonbury, Connecticut on April 3, 1821 to Jonathan and Jerusha Welles. He grew up working on the family's farm and later attended Trinity College, graduating in 1843. He went on to study law and was admitted to the bar in 1845. In 1850 he was elected to the Connecticut General Assembly.

In 1853 Welles moved west, arriving in St. Paul, Minnesota, that June. Shortly after arriving he visited St. Anthony Falls and became taken by the sight. He relocated to the young city of St. Anthony and went into the lumber business with Franklin Steele. In 1855 he was elected the first mayor of St. Anthony. In that same year he and Steele built the first major bridge crossing the Mississippi between what was then the two towns of St. Anthony and Minneapolis. In 1863 Welles was the Democratic nominee for governor but lost to Stephen Miller.

Welles was closely tied to various business interests in the Minneapolis area. He was involved in the organization of the Northwestern National Bank and the Farmers & Mechanics Savings Bank. He was also a strong advocate for the Minneapolis & Duluth and Minneapolis & St. Louis railroads. Outside of Minneapolis and St. Anthony Welles also owned significant real estate in the towns of St. Cloud, Minnesota, and Breckenridge, Minnesota, much of which he gave away. He also gave significant support to the Minnesota State Academies in Faribault, Minnesota, and various churches in Minneapolis.

Welles died in Minneapolis on March 4, 1898. He is buried in Lakewood Cemetery in Minneapolis.

References

External links
 

1821 births
1898 deaths
Minnesota lawyers
Minnesota Democrats
Trinity College (Connecticut) alumni
Burials at Lakewood Cemetery
19th-century American lawyers